The France national under-18 football team is the national under-18 football team of France and is controlled by the French Football Federation. The under-18 team typically participated in friendly matches and tournaments, such as the Lafarge Foot Avenir and the Taça do Atlântico. The team serves as a feeder team to the under-19 team.

France have won the UEFA European Under-18 Football Championship — which ran from 1981-2001 — four times in 1983,1996,1997 and 2000. 

France also won the Mediterranean Games in 2022.

Players

Current squad
 The following players were called up for the Football at the 2022 Mediterranean Games.
 Match dates: 26 June – 3 July 2022
 Caps and goals correct as of: 26 March 2022, after the match against 

HonoursUEFA European Under-18 Football ChampionshipChampions (4): 1983, 1996, 1997, 2000Lafarge Foot Avenir - Tournoi de Limoges'Champions (7):'' 2007, 2008, 2010, 2012, 2013, 2015, 2016

References

External links
 Official site 

Under-18
European national under-18 association football teams
Youth football in France